Tornado is a 1943 film directed by William A. Berke and starring Chester Morris and Nancy Kelly.

Plot
Pete Ramsey (Morris) is a hard-working coal miner who falls in love with and marries scheming showgirl Victory Kane (Kelly). Victory presses Pete to fight for the position of the mine superintendent, which he earns. Still unwilling to bear her poor surroundings and unsatisfied with being a miner's wife, Victory decides to climb the social ladder by having an affair with the wealthy owner of the mine, Gary Linden (Conway), unbeknownst to her faithful husband. Suddenly, a ferocious tornado hits the town and the mine, putting everyone in danger.

Cast
Chester Morris as Pete Ramsey
Nancy Kelly as Vactie Kane
William Henry as Bob Ramsey 
Gwen Kenyon as Sally Vlochek
Joe Sawyer as Charlie Boswell
Marie McDonald as Diana Linden
Morgan Conway as Gary Linden
Nestor Paiva as Big Joe Vlochek

Production
The film was based on the unpublished novel Black Tornado by John Guedel. (When Guedel was eight years old, his father's factory was destroyed by a tornado.)

In July 1942, Pine-Thomas announced they would make a film of the novel starring their regular male leads, Richard Arlen and Chester Morris, plus Sylvia Sidney. In September 1942 they said Arlen would make the film, which had the working title of Cyclone, after he finished Aerial Gunner. Then in March 1943 it was announced as a vehicle for Morris only, as Black Tornado.

Gail Russell was going to play the role of Sally but then was called in to replace Diana Lynn in a Harry Aldrich film, Henry Aldrich Gets Glamour (1943). Russell was replaced by Gwen Kenyon. Bill Henry was signed off the back of his performance in Pine-Thomas' Alaskan Highway. He later signed a long-term contract with Pine-Thomas.

Nancy Kelly was cast in the female lead. She sang two songs, "Who Done It" and "There Goes My Dream", with music by Frank Loesser and lyrics by Hoagy Carmichael and Frederick Hollander respectively.

Filming took place in April 1943. After the film, Morris signed a deal with Pine Thomas to make three more movies for the company.

References

External links

Tornado at BFI

Review of film at Variety

1943 films
American black-and-white films
American drama films
1940s English-language films
Films about tornadoes
Films based on American novels
Films directed by William A. Berke
Films scored by Freddie Rich
Films set in 1939
Films set in Illinois
Films about mining
Paramount Pictures films
1943 drama films
1940s American films